Yanlā (Nepal Bhasa: ञला) is the eleventh month in the Nepal Era calendar, the national lunar calendar of Nepal. The month coincides with Bhadrapada (भाद्रपद) in the Hindu lunar calendar and September in the Gregorian calendar.

Yanlā begins with the new moon and the full moon falls on the 15th of the lunar month. The month is divided into the bright and dark fortnights which are known as Yanlā Thwa (ञला थ्व) and Yanlā Gā (ञला गा) respectively.

Among the major events of the month, the 4th day of the bright fortnight is Ganesha Chaturthi which marks the birthday of the Hindu deity of good fortune Ganesha. It is known as Chathā (चथा) in Nepal Bhasa.

The highlight of Yanlā is Yenyā (येँयाः). The name means "Festival of Kathmandu" and it is the largest religious street celebration in the Nepalese capital. Also known as Indra Jātrā, it consists of chariot processions of the Living Goddess Kumari, masked dances of deities, pageants and displays of sacred images. Yenyā lasts for eight days from the 12th day of the bright fortnight to the 4th day of the dark fortnight.

Days in the month

Months of the year

References

Months
Nepali calendar
Nepalese culture